Varengeville-sur-Mer (literally Varengeville on Sea) is a commune in the Seine-Maritime department in the Normandy region in north-western France.

Geography
The commune has access to the pebble beach by means of a gap in the huge chalk cliffs.

Heraldry

Population

Places of interest

 The manorhouse known as the Manoir d'Ango, built between 1530 and 1545 by Jean Ango,
 The church of St. Valery, dating from the thirteenth century, sits atop the cliffs and is at risk of falling into the sea if the cliff were to collapse in any way. The churchyard holds the tomb of the Cubist artist Georges Braque, topped by a mosaic of a white dove. Inside the church is a stained glass window by Braque depicting the Tree of Jesse.
 The chapel of St. Dominique, on the road from Varengeville to Dieppe, with more stained glass windows by Braque.
 Two chateaus, at Saint-Aubin and Quesnot.
 The sixteenth century hunting lodge of King Francis I.
 The cemetery, by the sea, with a sixteenth-century sandstone cross and containing the tombs of some famous Frenchmen: the writer Georges de Porto-Riche, composer Albert Roussel, Georges Braque and the architect, Paul Nelson.
 The ‘Maison du Bois des Moutiers'Bois des Moutiers, near the church, was conceived by Guillaume Mallet in 1898 and designed by the architect Sir Edwin Lutyens. It was one of Lutyens' first commissions. A Burne-Jones tapestry hangs in the stairwell, its designs copied from Renaissance cloth in William Morris's studio. The house is surrounded by a 9-acre park, with gardens designed by Miss Gertrude Jekyll. The estate was purchased by Jerome Seydoux in March 2019. 
 'Shamrock', which has the biggest collection of hortensias in the world, with more than 1000 varieties. This collection has been assembled by the ‘Conservatoire français des collections végétales spécialisées' (CCVS).

People

Georges Braque (1883–1963), artist, buried in the cemetery
Albert Roussel (1869–1937), composer, buried in the cemetery
Georges de Porto-Riche (1849–1930), writer, buried in the cemetery
Jean-Francis Auburtin (1866–1930), artist, died here
Paul Nelson (1895–1979), architect, buried in the cemetery
Jean Ango (1480–1551), shipping magnate and navigator, lived here
Claude Monet (1840–1926), spent some time painting here

Twinning
The village is twinned with Herstmonceux in East Sussex, in the United Kingdom

In literature

Naomi Mitchison, in her autobiographic book You May Well Ask, relates that in the 1920s and 1930 she and her family, along with other families of their social circle in London, used to have vacations in Varengeville: "At the small village of Varengeville, on top of the cliffs a few miles west of Dieppe, the families with children lived in fairly basic chalets which were fine for us. We ate at the hotel and went down a steep path to the sand and rather chilly swimming, and tremendously enjoyed each other's company".

See also
Communes of the Seine-Maritime department

References

External links

 
Tourism in Varengeville-sur-Mer and the region: the Alabaster Coast

Communes of Seine-Maritime
Populated coastal places in France